A britzka (also spelled brichka or britska) is a type of horse-drawn carriage. It was a long, spacious carriage with four wheels, as well as a  folding top over the rear seat and a rear-facing front seat. Pulled by two horses, it had a place in the front for a driver. It was constructed as to give space for reclining at night when used on a journey. Its size made it suitable for use as a 19th-century equivalent to a motorhome, as it could be adapted with all manner of conveniences (beds, dressing tables etc.) for the traveler. 

The great railway engineer Isambard Kingdom Brunel used a britzka, the "Flying Coffin", as his traveling office whilst surveying the route of the Great Western Railway. He carried with him a drawing board, outline plans, engineering instruments, fifty of his favorite Lopez cigars and a pull-out bed.

The term is a variant of the Polish term bryczka, a "little cart", from bryka, "cart", possibly coming into English via several ways, including  German britschka and  Russian brichka.

See also 
 Types of carriages

References

Carriages